Georges Decultot (3 March 1893 – 31 January 1976) was a French racing cyclist. He rode in the 1924 Tour de France.

References

External links
 

1893 births
1976 deaths
French male cyclists
Place of birth missing